Sylvie Olivé is a French production designer of film and television. She is a member of the Association des Décorateurs de Cinéma (ADC). She is most notable for her work in Mr. Nobody (2009), which earned her the Golden Osella for Outstanding Technical Contribution at the 66th Venice International Film Festival.

Selected filmography

References

External links
 

European Film Awards winners (people)
French production designers
Living people
Year of birth missing (living people)
Women production designers
21st-century French women